Vladimir Shchemelev (born 1972 or 1973) is a Russian banker and professional poker player from St. Petersburg, Russia. He is an online cash game player earning over $1,600,000 playing under the alias GVOZDIKA55 on PokerStars and NEKOTYAN on Full Tilt Poker. He specializes in mixed games.

Poker career
Shchemelev made two cashes in the 2007 WSOP. In 2010, he was a relatively unknown player who had success in The Poker Player's Championship finishing runner-up to Michael Mizrachi for $963,375. He went on to cash an additional three times that year.

In 2013, he won his first bracelet in the $3,000 Pot Limit Omaha Hi/Lo event for $279,094.

As of 2014, Shchemelev's total live tournament winnings exceed $1,900,000 of which $1,800,231 come from cashes at the WSOP.

World Series of Poker

References

External links
 Vladimir Shchemelev Hendon Mob profile

Russian poker players
World Series of Poker bracelet winners
Living people
Year of birth uncertain
Year of birth missing (living people)